Explorer 3 (Harvard designation 1958 Gamma) was an American artificial satellite launched into medium Earth orbit in 1958. It was the second successful launch in the Explorer program, and was nearly identical to the first U.S. satellite Explorer 1 in its design and mission.

Background
The U.S. Earth satellite program began in 1954 as a joint U.S. Army and U.S. Navy proposal, called Project Orbiter, to put a scientific satellite into orbit during the International Geophysical Year (IGY). The proposal, using a U.S. Army Redstone missile, was rejected in 1955 by the Eisenhower administration in favor of the U.S. Navy's Project Vanguard, using a booster advertised as more civilian in nature. Following the launch of the Soviet satellite Sputnik 1 on 4 October 1957, the initial Project Orbiter program was revived as the Explorer program to catch up with the Soviet Union.

Launch
The satellite was launched from Cape Canaveral Missile Test Center of the Atlantic Missile Range (AMR), in Florida at 17:38:01 GMT on 26 March 1958 by the Juno I launch vehicle. The Juno I had its origins in the United States Army's Project Orbiter in 1954. The project was canceled in 1955 when the decision was made to proceed with Project Vanguard.

Following the launch of the Soviet Sputnik 1 on 4 October 1957, Army Ballistic Missile Agency (ABMA) was directed to proceed with the launching of a satellite using the Jupiter-C which had already been flight-tested in nose-cone re-entry tests for the Jupiter IRBM (intermediate-range ballistic missile). Working closely together, ABMA and Jet Propulsion Laboratory (JPL) completed the job of modifying the Jupiter-C to the Juno I and building the Explorer I in 84 days.

Spacecraft

Explorer 3 was launched in conjunction with the International Geophysical Year (IGY) by the U.S. Army (Ordnance) into an eccentric orbit. The objective of this spacecraft was a continuation of experiments started with Explorer 1. The payload consisted of a cosmic ray counter (a Geiger-Müller tube) and a micrometeorite detector (a wire grid array and acoustic detector). The Explorer 3 spacecraft was spin-stabilized and had an on-board tape recorder to provide a complete radiation history for each orbit. It was discovered soon after launch that the satellite was in a tumbling motion with a period of about 7 seconds. Explorer 3 decayed from orbit on 28 June 1958, after 93 days of operation.

Mission results
The discovery of the Van Allen radiation belt by the Explorer satellites was considered to be one of the outstanding discoveries of the International Geophysical Year (IGY).

The instrument section at the front end of the satellite and the empty scaled-down fourth-stage rocket casing orbited as a single unit, spinning around its long axis at 750 revolutions per minute. Data from these instruments was transmitted to the ground by a 60 milliwatt transmitter operating on 108.03 MHz and a 10 milliwatt transmitter operating on 108.00 MHz.

Transmitting antennas consisted of two fiberglass slot antennas in the body of the satellite itself. The four flexible whip antennas of Explorer 1 were removed from the design. The external skin of the instrument section was painted in alternate strips of white and dark green to provide passive temperature control of the satellite. The proportions of the light and dark strips were determined by studies of shadow-sunlight intervals based on firing time, trajectory, orbit, and orbital inclination.

Electrical power was provided by Mallory type RM Mercury batteries that made up approximately 40% of the payload weight. These provided power that operated the high power transmitter for 31 days and the low-power transmitter for 105 days. Because of the limited space available and the requirements for low weight, the Explorer 3 instrumentation was designed and built with simplicity and high reliability in mind. It was completely successful.

Explorer 3 decayed from orbit on 28 June 1958, after 93 days of operation.

A replica of the spacecraft is currently located in the Smithsonian Institution's National Air and Space Museum, Milestones of Flight Gallery.

See also

Timeline of artificial satellites and space probes
Explorer program

References

External links

Data Sheet, Department of Astronautics, National Air and Space Museum, Smithsonian Institution.

Spacecraft launched in 1958
Spacecraft which reentered in 1958
Explorers Program
1958 in the United States